Joseph Haydn's Horn Concerto No. 1 in D major, (Hob. VIId/3) was completed in 1762, "when Haydn was new to the Esterhazy court."

Because of the low range writing in the Adagio, some musicologists believe the concerto was written for Thaddaus Steinmüller. Other musicologists believe it was a present for the baptism ceremony of one of the children of Joseph Leutgeb (for whom Mozart wrote his horn concertos).

Structure

The work is in three movements:

Allegro
Adagio
Allegro

References
Notes

Sources

External links
 
 
 

Concertos by Joseph Haydn
Haydn 1
Compositions in D major
1762 compositions